Sanyangzhuang is an archaeological site in Henan Province, China.

The Han dynasty village of Sanyangzhuang was buried by a flood of the Yellow River 2,000 years ago. 

This site is extraordinarily well-preserved, and provides important information for the research on the basic social structure of the Han dynasty, revealing information on how and where the lower class worked and lived. The site is particularly rich in information on the farming system and land distribution system. The discovery of preserved mulberry leaves and copper coins suggests early involvement with trade along the Silk Road. 

The site was discovered by archaeologists in 2003. Research at Sanyangzhuang is being conducted by scholars from Washington University in St. Louis, the Henan Provincial Archaeological Institute, and the College of Environmental Science and Engineering, Peking University.

References

Archaeological sites in China
Major National Historical and Cultural Sites in Henan
Han dynasty
2003 archaeological discoveries